Khrabrovo is the name of several rural localities in Russia:
Khrabrovo, Ivanovo Oblast, a village in Ivanovsky District of Ivanovo Oblast
Khrabrovo, Kaliningrad Oblast, a settlement in Khrabrovsky Rural Okrug of Guryevsky District of Kaliningrad Oblast
Khrabrovo, Dmitrovsky District, Moscow Oblast, a selo under the administrative jurisdiction of the Town of Yakhroma in Dmitrovsky District of Moscow Oblast
Khrabrovo, Mozhaysky District, Moscow Oblast, a village in Zamoshinskoye Rural Settlement of Mozhaysky District of Moscow Oblast
Khrabrovo, Ozyorsky District, Moscow Oblast, a village in Klishinskoye Rural Settlement of Ozyorsky District of Moscow Oblast
Khrabrovo, Taldomsky District, Moscow Oblast, a village in Yermolinskoye Rural Settlement of Taldomsky District of Moscow Oblast